The Baseline League is a high school athletic conference that is part of the CIF Southern Section. Members are located in San Bernardino County, with Damien and St. Lucy's located in Los Angeles County.  The Baseline League was formed in 1979, with original members Claremont High School, Glendora High School, Pomona High School, Chaffey High School, Damien High School, St. Lucy's Priory High School, Pomona Catholic Girl's High School, and Upland High School.

Members
 Chino Hills High School
 Damien High School (all-boys school) 
 Etiwanda High School
 Los Osos High School
 Rancho Cucamonga High School
 St. Lucy's Priory High School (all-girls school)
 Upland High School

References 

CIF Southern Section leagues